Alex Epstein may refer to:
Alex Epstein (American writer) (born 1980), American energy theorist
Alex Epstein (Israeli writer) (born 1971) Russian-born Israeli writer, known for his micro stories
Alex Epstein (writer), (born 1963), American/Canadian screenwriter (TV, film and video games) and book author